Bangalaia bipunctipennis is a species of beetle in the family Cerambycidae. It was described by Stephan von Breuning in 1966. It is known from the Democratic Republic of the Congo.

References

Prosopocerini
Beetles described in 1966
Endemic fauna of the Democratic Republic of the Congo